"I Believe" is a song sung by Canadian jazz-pop singer Nikki Yanofsky. Written by Stephan Moccio and Alan Frew for Canada's Olympic Broadcast Media Consortium, it was used as the official promotional song for both the 2010 Winter Olympics in Vancouver and the 2012 Summer Olympics in London, and as the theme song for the former. Themes from this song appeared in the main title sequence music, and were used to create cues for use during actual Olympic coverage broadcasts. A French version of the song, "J'imagine" was recorded and sung by Annie Villeneuve.

Background
Both the English and French versions were recorded in Montreal, Quebec, along with the help of The Montreal Symphony Orchestra and children from the area, who supplied the backing vocals in both languages.

It was noted in the media that the lyric "I believe in the power of you and I" is grammatically incorrect.

This song is also available on Nikki's new album, Nikki, which received a gold certification from the Canadian Recording Industry Association in June, 2010.

Reception
It reached number one on the Canadian Hot 100 issue dated February 27, 2010.

Chart performance
Nikki Yanofsky

Year-end charts

Annie Villeneuve

References

Nikki Yanofsky songs
2010 songs
2010 singles
Canadian Hot 100 number-one singles
Canadian pop songs
Songs written by Stephan Moccio
Songs written by Alan Frew
Song recordings produced by Phil Ramone
Olympic songs
2010 Winter Olympics
Macaronic songs
Universal Music Canada singles